The 2012–13 season is PAS Giannina F.C.'s 18th competitive season in the top flight of Greek football, 3rd season in the Super League Greece, and 47th year in existence as a football club. They also compete in the Greek Cup.

Players 
Updated:-

International players

Foreign players

Personnel

Management

Coaching staff

medical staff

Academy

Transfers

Summer

In

Out 

For recent transfers, see List of Greek football transfers summer 2012

Winter

In

Out

Pre-season and friendlies

Competitions

Super League Greece

League table

Results summary

Fixtures

UEFA play-offs

Fixtures

Greek cup

Third round

Fourth round

Quarter-finals

Statistics

Appearances 

Super League Greece

Goalscorers 

Super League Greece

Clean sheets

Disciplinary record

Awards 
Best Manager in Greece:Giannis Christopoulos

References

External links 

 Official Website

PAS Giannina F.C. seasons
Greek football clubs 2012–13 season